"Quand je serai jeune" is the debut single by French singer Priscilla. She released it in September 2001, at the age of 12. Both songs the single contained would later appear on her debut album, Cette vie nouvelle, which would be out in June of the next year.

Track listing

Charts

Certifications

References 

2001 songs
2001 debut singles
Priscilla Betti songs
Jive Records singles
Songs written by Philippe Osman